The Severin Motor Car Company was a short-lived automobile manufacturer that started making cars in 1920 in Kansas City, Missouri and ended in accusations of stock fraud in 1921.

History
Homer T. Severin formed Severin Motor Car Company in his native Kansas City and production began in July 1920.  The Severin Model H was offered as a 5-passenger touring car for $2,400.   Power came from a Continental Motors Company six-cylinder engine.

Homer Severin went to California and announce intentions to move the company to a site in Oakland, California.  He began selling stock but did not get permits to do so.  He decided to leave the automobile business and went into real estate instead.   Mohawk Motor Company took over the Severin assets but was bankrupt within a month.  Metropolitan Motors Corporation took over the assets to build the remaining 300 Severins from parts on hand. The last Severins were assembled in 1922

References

Defunct motor vehicle manufacturers of the United States
Defunct companies based in Missouri
Companies based in Kansas City, Missouri
Vehicle manufacturing companies established in 1920
Vehicle manufacturing companies disestablished in 1921
1920 establishments in Missouri
1921 disestablishments in Missouri
Vintage vehicles
1920s cars
Motor vehicle manufacturers based in Missouri
Cars introduced in 1920